"No Vacancy" is a song by American pop rock band OneRepublic. It was released as a single via digital download on April 28, 2017. It was written by band members Ryan Tedder, Brent Kutzle, Drew Brown, and Zach Filkins, as well as Tor Erik Hermansen and Mikkel Storleer Eriksen from the Norwegian production and songwriting duo Stargate. The song was co-produced by Stargate and Tedder.

Background
After the release of OneRepublic's fourth full-length studio album, Oh My My, the band halted all plans for touring and promoting the album following its release. Ryan Tedder described in a lengthy post on the band's official Facebook page that they suffered from "crippling anxiety" due to the band's constant touring, recording, and promoting methods. Tedder revealed that the band was to begin releasing a new song "monthly, weekly sometimes", departing from their typical album cycle process. He went on to describe the band's future releases by stating "[the songs] will be varied and with collaborations and may feel bonkers at first. Some will be remixes, others will be just me on piano or guitar. Some will sound super trendy and new, some will sound classic and old school or very OneRepublic." In the same post, Tedder confirmed that the band were to release "new music scheduled 2 weeks" after "No Vacancy". The song is the first of a string of singles to be released by OneRepublic.

As of March 20, 2022, the song's lyric video has reached over 37 million views.

Composition
"No Vacancy" is a reggae-inspired tropical pop song. It features falsetto vocals from lead vocalist and songwriter Ryan Tedder, ska-inspired guitars, and heavy use of synthesizers. It was written by Tedder, Brent Kutzle, Drew Brown, Zach Filkins, as well as Tor Erik Hermansen and Mikkel Storleer Eriksen from the Norwegian production and songwriting duo Stargate. The song was co-produced by Tedder and Stargate and recorded during a string of sessions in January 2017. This song was originally intended for Selena Gomez.

Track listing

Credits and personnel
OneRepublic
 Ryan Tedder – lead vocals, guitar, piano, keyboards, bass, drums, percussion, songwriting, production
 Zach Filkins – guitar, viola, drums, percussion, backing vocals, songwriting
 Drew Brown – guitar, piano, keyboards, bass, drums, percussion, backing vocals, songwriting
 Eddie Fisher – drums, percussion
 Brent Kutzle – bass, guitar, piano, keyboards, backing vocals, percussion, songwriting, production

Additional personnel
 Stargate – production, songwriting

Charts

Weekly charts

Year-end charts

Certifications

Release history

References

2017 singles
2017 songs
OneRepublic songs
Songs written by Tor Erik Hermansen
Songs written by Mikkel Storleer Eriksen
Songs written by Ryan Tedder
Songs written by Brent Kutzle
Songs written by Zach Filkins
Interscope Records singles